Julio César Zapata (born 22 July 1976) is an Argentine professional golfer.

Early life and career
Zapata was born in Rafaela, Santa Fe Province, and turned professional in 1997.

In 2005, Zapata was second in the Argentina Tour rankings, winning the Norpatagonico Open and finishing second in five other tournaments, including the Argentine Masters and the Coast Open. The following year, he won the Players Championship on the Tour de las Américas, and was third on that tour's Order of Merit. In 2008 he won the South Open, the last tournament of the 2008 TPG Tour.

Following a successful season on the Challenge Tour in 2007 with eight top ten finishes, highlighted by a second-place finish in Challenge of Ireland, he graduated to the European Tour in 2008. He finished 138th on the Order of Merit, with a best result of 11th in the Omega European Masters, and as a result failed to maintain his playing privileges and dropped back down to the Challenge Tour for 2009, where he did enough to regain his European Tour card for 2011 by ending the season in 11th place on the rankings.

Professional wins (16)

TPG Tour wins (8)

Other Argentine wins (6)
 2000 Parana Open
 2002 La Cumbre Grand Prix
 2003 Villa Mercedes Open
 2004 San Nicolas Grand Prix
 2005 Norpatagonico Open
 2006 Tandil Open

Other wins (2)
 2006 TLA Players Championship (Mexico)
 2010 Santo Domingo Open (Chile)

See also
 2007 Challenge Tour graduates
 2010 Challenge Tour graduates

References

External links
 
 

Argentine male golfers
PGA Tour Latinoamérica golfers
European Tour golfers
Sportspeople from Santa Fe Province
People from Rafaela
1977 births
Living people